Harry Zacariah Finch (born 10 February 1995) is an English cricketer who plays for Kent County Cricket Club. He is a right-handed batsman who bowls right-arm medium-fast. Finch played forSussex between 2013 and 2020 before signing for Kent in 2021, initially on a short-term contract.

Finch was part of age-group sides at Sussex from the age of 10 and made his senior debut in a List A match against the Netherlands on 20 May 2013. He was released by Sussex at the end of the 2020 season and played for Kent's Second XI during the early months of the 2021 season. He made his senior debut for Kent following a member of the county's First XI squad testing positive for COVID-19 which required the players involved in the county's previous match to all self-isolate. As a result, a number of Second XI players or "homegrown prospects" were drafted into the squad and made their senior debuts for the county. On 10 August 2022, Finch re-joined Kent for the remainder of the One-Day Cup as cover for a number of players absent due to injuries and The Hundred. He has also played Australian Grade cricket for Yarraville Cricket Club.

Finch was born at Hastings in Sussex in 1995 and was educated at St Richard's Catholic College in Bexhill-on-Sea and Eastbourne College. His father, Jason, played for Sussex's Second XI and List A and Minor Counties Trophy cricket for Sussex Cricket Board.

References

External links
 

1995 births
Living people
Sportspeople from Hastings
English cricketers
Sussex cricketers